VTA may refer to:

Organizations 
 Vancouver Traffic Authority, a department within the Vancouver Police Department
 Santa Clara Valley Transportation Authority, California, United States
 Martha's Vineyard Transit Authority, Massachusetts, United States
VTA, Russian language acronym for Military Transport Aviation

Other 
 Vascular-targeting agent, anti-cancer drug
 Ventral tegmental area (in neuroanatomy), part of the midbrain tegmentum